Sir Kenneth Mackenzie, 3rd Baronet (c. 1658 – 13 September 1728) was a Scottish politician who served as a shire commissioner for Cromartyshire in the Parliament of Scotland and as one of the first Scottish MPs in the new Parliament of Great Britain. 

The younger son of Sir George Mackenzie, 2nd Baronet, his father resigned the baronetcy to him in 1704 after being created Earl of Cromartie.

He was chosen as a shire commissioner for Cromartyshire in the Parliament of Scotland, sitting from 1693 to 1707. He was then one of the 43  Scottish MPs selected to represent Scotland in the first Parliament of Great Britain in 1707.

He twice represented the constituency of Cromartyshire in the Parliament of Great Britain from 1 November 1710 – 29 September 1713 and from 15 September 1727 to his death.

He married 3 times and left 6 sons and 2 daughters by his second wife, Anne Campbell. He was succeeded by his eldest son, Sir George Mackenzie.

References

Year of birth uncertain
1728 deaths
Baronets in the Baronetage of Nova Scotia
Members of the Parliament of Scotland 1689–1702
Members of the Parliament of Scotland 1702–1707
British MPs 1707–1708
British MPs 1710–1713
British MPs 1727–1734
Members of the Parliament of Great Britain for Scottish constituencies
Shire Commissioners to the Parliament of Scotland
Scottish knights
Younger sons of earls